Vitamilk is a soy milk product produced by Thailand's Green Spot Co., Ltd. Vitamilk was introduced in 1958 as the first ready-to-drink soy milk brand in Thailand, and is now (as of 2019) second in market share at 27 percent, following the market leader Lactasoy at 55 percent.

Green Spot Co., Ltd. was established by banker/entrepreneur Chin Sophonpanich in 1954 as the local bottler for the Green Spot brand of orange drink. The company's soy milk products now account for 95 percent of its revenue, 30 percent of which comes from exports, mainly to Asia and Africa.

References

Soy product brands
Thai drink brands